This is a list of all known Ladyfest festivals worldwide.

2019
LaDIY*fest #2, Strasbourg (France), August 30–31, September 1, laDIY*fest Strasbourg 2019
LadyFest: a \'kwirdo/(m) edition, Maastricht 4–5 May LadyFest Maastricht

2018
LaDIY*fest Strasbourg (France) – 30 August-2 September archives (laDIY*fest Strasbourg #1, 2018)
LadyFest Binghamton (New York) – April 6–7
Ladyfest Shanghai (China) – 24 March & 10 June
LadyFest Budapest (Hungary) – 6–8 July
LadyFest Lexington (Kentucky) – September 22
LadyFest Maastricht – 5/6 May LadyFest Maastricht
Ladyfest Montreal (Canada) - September 3–9

2017 
LaDIYfest Freiburg – 13th to 15 of October 2017
LaDIYfest Leipzig – 19 to 21 May
Lady*fest Heidelberg – 15th to 18 June
Lady*fest Karlsruhe – 26nd to 27 August 2017
Lady*fest Tallinn – 8th to 12 of March
Ladyfest Budapest – 17th to 18 of June 2017
LadyFest Maastricht – 6 and 7 of May
Ladyfest Montreal - 4th to 10 September 2017
Ladyfest Shanghai (China) – 11 March & 10 June

2016

 Ladyfest Barcelona (Barcelona, Spain) – June 23–26, 2016 
Ladyfest Manchester (Manchester, United Kingdom) October 7–9, 2016
name=ladyfestbarcelona>—Ladyfest Barcelona 2016</ref>

 Ladyfest Brussels (Forest, Brussels, Belgium) – March 18–20, 2016
 Ladyfest Montreal (Montreal, Quebec, Canada) – September 12–18, 2016
 Ladyfest New Orleans (New Orleans, Louisiana, USA) – October 29 – November 6, 2016
 Ladyfest Shanghai (Shanghai, China) – March 4–5, 2016
 Ladyfest Tallinn (Tallinn, Estonia) – March 8–12, 2016

2015

 Ladyfest (Kalamazoo, Michigan, USA) – March, 2015
 Ladyfest Atlanta (Atlanta, Georgia, USA) – March 20–22, 2015
 Ladyfest Baltimore (Baltimore, USA) – May 29 – June 1, 2015
 Ladyfest Dayton (Dayton, Ohio, USA) – August 28–29, 2015
 Ladyfest Kassel (Kassel, Germany) – July 31, – August 2, 2015
 Ladyfest Lehigh Valley (LeHigh Valley, Pennsylvania, USA) – January 15–30, 2015
 Ladyfest Manchester (Manchester, United Kingdom) – November 14, 2015
 Ladyfest Miami (Miami, Florida, USA) – September 25–26, 2015
 Ladyfest New Orleans (New Orleans, Louisiana, USA) – October 31 – November 8, 2015
 Ladyfest Oslo (Oslo, Norway) – March 7–8, 2015
 Ladyfest Rostock (Rostock, Germany) – September 9–13, 2015
 Ladyfest Shanghai (Shanghai, China) – March 7, 2015
 Ladyfest Tallinn (Tallinn, Estonia) – March 3–7, 2015
 Ladyfest Ukraine (Kyiv, Ukraine) – April 4–6, 2015

2014

 GrrlFest Melbourne (Melbourne, Australia) – January 11, 2014
 Ladyfest Brussels (Forest, Brussels, Belgium) – March 14–16, 2014
 Ladyfest Erie (Erie, Pennsylvania, USA) – April 12, 2014
 Ladyfest Miami (Miami, Florida, USA) – September 19–20, 2014
 Ladyfest Milano (Milan, Italy) – June 6–8, 2014
 Ladyfest New Orleans (New Orleans, Louisiana, USA) – November 5–9, 2014
 Ladyfest Shanghai (Shanghai, China) – March 8, 2014. First Ladyfest in Mainland China.

2013

 GrrlFest Melbourne (Melbourne, Australia) – January 10, 2013 
 Ladyfest Bay Area (San Francisco, CA, USA) – September 2013
 Ladyfest London (London, Ontario, Canada) – June 2013
 Ladyfest Madrid (Madrid, Spain) – June 20–23, 2013
 Ladyfest New Orleans (New Orleans, Louisiana, USA) – November 7–10, 2013

2012

 "F-Word" Ladyfest (Florida State University, Tallahassee, FL, USA) – April 14, 2012 
 Ladyfest Frosinone (Frosinone, Lazio, Italy) - 29-September 5 October 2012 https://www.facebook.com/groups/258273810872293/
 Ladyfest London (London, Ontario, Canada) – June 2012
 Ladyfest Mainz (Mainz, Germany) – July 13–15, 2012 
 Ladyfest New Orleans (New Orleans, Louisiana, USA) - November 7–11, 2012
 Ladyfest Providence (Pawtucket, RI, USA) – September 21–23, 2012
 Ladyfest Zagreb/"Vox Feminae" (Zagreb, Croatia) – Nov 21–24, 2012

2011

 "Vox Feminae" Ladyfest Zagreb (Zagreb, Croatia) – Nov 3–8, 2011
 Ladyfest Bellingham (Bellingham, WA, USA) – June 15–19, 2011 
 Ladyfest London (London, Ontario, Canada) – June 2011
 Ladyfest New Orleans (New Orleans, Louisiana, USA) – November 3–6, 2011

2010

 "Vox Feminae" Ladyfest Zagreb (Zagreb, Croatia) – Sep 16–19, 2010
 * Ladyfest New Orleans (New Orleans, Louisiana, USA) – November 7–11, 2010
 Ladyfest Bellingham (Bellingham, WA, USA) – June 17–20, 2010
 Ladyfest London (London, Ontario, Canada) – June 2010

2009

 "Vox Feminae" Ladyfest Zagreb (Zagreb, Croatia) – Sep 30-Oct 4, 2009
 * Ladyfest New Orleans (New Orleans, Louisiana, USA) – November 4–8, 2009
 Ladyfest Bellingham (Bellingham, WA, USA) – June 2009
 Ladyfest Wellington (Wellington, New Zealand) Dec 3–5, 2009
 Ladyfesta Bilbao (Bilbao, Spain) – June 26, 2009

2008

 "Vox Feminae" Ladyfest Zagreb (Zagreb, Croatia) – Nov 28, 2008
 Ladyfest New Orleans (New Orleans, Louisiana, USA) – October 15–19, 2008
 Ladyfesta Bilbao (Bilbao, Spain) – June 20 & Dec 19, 2008

2007

 "Vox Feminae" Ladyfest Zagreb (Zagreb, Croatia) – Oct 12–14, 2007
 Ladyfest New Orleans (New Orleans, Louisiana, USA) – November 14–18, 2007
 Ladyfest Romania (Bucharest, Romania) – October 12–14, 2007
 Ladyfest Turku (Turku, Finland) – May 17–19, 2007
 Ladyfest Wien (Wien, Vienna, Austria) – May 16–20, 2007
 Ladyfesta Bilbao (Bilbao, Spain) – March 9 & November 9, 2007

2006

 Ladyfest Frankfurt/main (Frankfurt/Main, Germany) – 2006 (email tba)
 Ladyfest Las Vegas (Las Vegas, Nevada, USA) – 2006
 Ladyfest Monterrey (Monterrey, Mexico) – February 2006
 Ladyfest New Orleans (New Orleans, Louisiana, USA) – November 2006
 Ladyfest Peninsular (Mérida, Yucatàn, Mexico) – 2006
 Ladyfest South (Atlanta, GA, USA) – Fall 2006
 Ladyfest Toulouse (Toulouse, France) – September/October 2006
 Ladyfest Wellington (Wellington, New Zealand) Dec 1–2, 2006
 Ladyfest Winnipeg (Winnipeg, Manitoba, Canada) – May 24–28, 2006

2005

 Ladyfest Arcata (Humboldt County, CA, USA) – April 2005? 
 Ladyfest Berlin (Berlin, Germany) – August 5–13, 2005
 Ladyfest Bielefeld (Bielefeld, Germany) – dates tba
 Ladyfest Brasil (Brazil) – March 12–13, 2005
 Ladyfest Brighton (Brighton, UK) – October 19–23, 2005
 Ladyfest Brisbane (Brisbane, Australia) – September 8–11, 2005 
 Ladyfest Buffalo (Buffalo, NY, USA) – Summer 2005
 Ladyfest Dresden (Dresden, Germany) – July 7–10, 2005
 Ladyfest East (New York, NY, USA) – October 14–16, 2005 
 Ladyfest Ekinda (Santa Maria Capua Vetere, Italy) – January 9, 2005
 Ladyfest Gothenburg (Gothenburg, Sweden) – November 3, 2005
 Ladyfest Guelph (Guelph, Canada) – September 23–24, 2005
 Ladyfest Hawaii (Honolulu, HI, USA) – March 3–6, 2005 
 Ladyfest Italia (Napoli, Italy) – July 21–23, 2005 
 Ladyfest Lansing (Lansing, MI, USA) – April 14–17 
 Ladyfest Malmö (Malmö, Sweden) – November 4, 2005 
 Ladyfest Mannheim (Mannheim, Germany) – October 14–16, 2005
 Ladyfest Mexico (Monterrey, Mexico) – February 12–13, La Casa de Pancho Villa Address: Calle Padre Mier No. 837 Pte. Centro
 Ladyfest North Carolina – Date ?
 Ladyfest North Carolina (Durham, NC, USA) – October 21–23, 2005
 Ladyfest Ohio (Columbus, OH, USA) – October 7–9, 2005
 Ladyfest Olympia – (Olympia, WA, USA) – July 28–31, 2005
 Ladyfest Ottawa (Ottawa, Canada) – September 15–18, 2005
 Ladyfest Out West (Denver, CO, USA) – August 5–7, 2005
 Ladyfest Romania (Timișoara, Romania) May 20–22, 2005
 Ladyfest San Diego (San Diego, CA, USA) – July 14–17, 2005
 Ladyfest Singapore (Singapore) – September 2005
 Ladyfest South Africa (Johannesburg, South Africa) – July 29, 2005
 Ladyfest Spain (Madrid, Spain) – October 28–29, 2005 
 Ladyfest Stockholm (Stockholm, Sweden) – November 5, 2005
 Ladyfest Switzerland (Zurich, Switzerland) – September 2005
 Ladyfest Warsaw (Warsaw, Poland) – Dec 9-11, 2005
 Ladyfest Wien/Vienna (Wien, Vienna, Austria) October 7–9, 2005
 Little Ladyfest (Philadelphia, PA, USA) – Date?

2004

 Ladyfest Adelaide – (Adelaide, Australia) – December 1–8
 Ladyfest Bay Area (San Francisco, CA, USA) – July 30 – August 1, 2004 
 Ladyfest Berlin (Berlin, Germany) – August 1–15, 2004 
 Ladyfest Biblebelt (Denton, TX, USA) – September 30-October 3, 2004
 Ladyfest Birmingham (Birmingham, UK) – July 9–11, 2004 
 Ladyfest Brazil – (São Paulo, Brazil) – March 13–14, 2004 
 Ladyfest Denmark (Denmark) – September 10–11, 2004
 Ladyfest Dublin – (Dublin, Ireland) – November 12–14, 2004 
 Ladyfest East (NYC) – October 29-November 1, 2004
 Ladyfest Guelph (Guelph, Canada) – May 29, 2004 
 Ladyfest Guelph (University of Guelph, Ontario) – May 29, 2004 
 Ladyfest Lansing (Lansing, MI, USA) – April 15–18, 2004 
 Ladyfest Leipzig (Leipzig, Germany) – October 22–23, 2004 
 Ladyfest Luxembourg – (Luxembourg) – March 6, 2004
 Ladyfest Ohio (Columbus, OH, USA) – May 28–31, 2004 
 Ladyfest Ottawa (Ottawa, Canada) – September 17–19, 2004
 Ladyfest Richmond (Richmond, VA, USA) – April 30-May 2, 2004 
 Ladyfest Seattle (Seattle, WA, USA) – June 24–27, 2004 
 Ladyfest South #2 – (Atlanta, GA, USA) – Nov 4–7, 2004 
 Ladyfest Stuttgart-ESSLINGEN (Stuttgart and Esslingen, Germany) – October 29–31, 2004 
 Ladyfest Sweden Stockholm April 30, 2004 / Malmö May 1, 2004 
 Ladyfest Texas (Austin, TX, USA) – May 27–30, 2004 
 Ladyfest Toronto (Toronto, Canada) – October 1–3, 2004 
 Ladyfest Trier – (Trier, Germany) – January 17, 2004 
 Ladyfest Vienna (Vienna, Austria) – June 10–13, 2004 
 Ladyfest Warsaw – (Warsaw, Poland) – November 12–14, 2004 
 Ladyfest Wien/Vienna (Wien, Vienna, Austria) – Oct 6-13, 2004

2003
 Ladyfest Amsterdam (Amsterdam, Netherlands) – August 27–31, 2003
 Ladyfest Auckland (Auckland, New Zealand) - November 27–30, 2003
 Ladyfest Berlin (Berlin, Germany) – August 15, 2003
 Ladyfest Bristol (Bristol, UK) – August 11–17, 2003 (list) 
 Ladyfest Devon (Devon, UK) – April 25–27, 2003 
 Ladyfest Florida (FL, USA) – March 6–9, 2003
 Ladyfest Halifax (Nova Scotia, Canada) – October 3–5, 2003 
 Ladyfest Hamburg (Hamburg, Germany) – September 4–7, 2003
 Ladyfest Jakarta (Jakarta, Indonesia) – April 16, 2003
 Ladyfest Lansing (Lansing, MI, USA) - date??
 Ladyfest Lansing (Lansing, MI, USA) – April 10–13, 2003(email) 
 Ladyfest Leipzig (Leipzig, Germany) – August 16, 2003
 Ladyfest Liege (Liège, Belgium) – October 3–4, 2003 
 Ladyfest Manchester (Manchester, UK) – Summer 2003 (list)
 Ladyfest Melbourne (Melbourne, Australia) – November 20–23, 2003
 Ladyfest Nantes (Nantes, France?) – October 9–11, 2003
 Ladyfest Orange County (Orange County, CA, USA) - Date? 
 Ladyfest Ottawa (Ottawa, Canada) - date??
 Ladyfest Out West (Denver, CO, USA) – June 18–22, 2003 (list)
 Ladyfest Philly (Philadelphia, PA, USA) – March 20–23, 2003 (list)
 Ladyfest Seattle (Seattle, WA, USA) – March 26–30, 2003
 Ladyfest Texas (Austin, TX, USA) – May 23–25, 2003 (email – list)

2002
 Ladyfest Amsterdam – July 26–28
 Ladyfest Bay Area (SF/Bay Area, CA, USA) - July 24–28, 2002
 Ladyfest Belgium – July 20, 2002
 Ladyfest D.C. (Washington, D.C., USA) – August 7–11, 2002
 Ladyfest East (#2!) (Brooklyn, NY, USA) – September 19–22, 2002 
 Ladyfest Lansing (Lansing, MI, USA) - April 11–14, 2002
 Ladyfest London – August 1–4, 2002
 Ladyfest Los Angeles (Los Angeles, CA, USA) – November 8–11, 2002
 Ladyfest Orlando (Orlando, FL, USA) – September 29, 2002
 Ladyfest Ottawa (Ottawa, Canada) - July 12–14, 2002
 Ladyfest South (Atlanta, GA, USA) – October 10–13, 2002 (list) 
 Ladyfest Toronto (Toronto, Canada) – September 8, 2002

2001
 Ladyfest East (New York City, NY, USA) – 2001
 Ladyfest East Hampton (Easthampton, MA, USA) – August 24–25, 2001
 Ladyfest Indiana (Bloomington, IN, USA) – April 5–8, 2001
 Ladyfest Midwest (Chicago, IL, USA) – August 16–19, 2001
 Ladyfest Scotland (Glasgow) – August 12–14, 2001

2000
 Ladyfest (Olympia, WA, USA) August 1–6, 2000

References 

Women's music